Hebe was a ship built at Bristol in 1791. She traded with the West Indies until a French privateer captured her in 1801.

Captain William Grumly received a letter of marque on 8 January 1794.

In 1796, her master was Richard Honneywill, and in 1797, Thomas Hatcher. Neither appears to have sailed under a letter of marque.

Captain Levers Alleyne (or Alleyne), received a letter of marque on 6 September 1799. He returned from Jamaica in 1800.

Captain John Smith received a letter of marque on 3 July 1800. He then sailed for Jamaica in September.

Lloyd's List reported on 20 January 1801 that a French privateer had captured Hebe, Smith, master, from Bristol to Jamaica, and taken her into Guadeloupe.

Citations and references
Citations

References
 

1791 ships
Ships built in Bristol
Age of Sail merchant ships
Merchant ships of the United Kingdom
Captured ships